Alexander McCluckie McSpadyen (19 December 1914 – 1978) was a Scottish footballer who played as an outside right, mainly for Partick Thistle as well as for Aberdeen as a guest player during World War II and Portadown after the conflict ended.

Having been brought in to the Partick squad as an inexperienced teenager to potentially replace the long-serving Davie Ness, McSpadyen won the Glasgow Merchants Charity Cup at the end of his first season with the Jags quickly became a first-team regular and gained international recognition before his career progress was halted by the outbreak of war, which occurred when he was aged 24 and appeared to be coming to the peak of his abilities. He joined the Army and appeared for their select team in charity matches, while also finding time to play for Partick Thistle in wartime competitions when possible. This brought his total number of appearances for the club to 297 with 33 goals, although his official SFL and Scottish Cup totals were less than half of that (130/13). After playing for Portadown, he returned to Holytown United as trainer until the club folded a year later.

McSpadyen represented Scotland twice, also playing in one unofficial wartime match, and making three appearances for the Scottish Football League XI, all between 1938 and 1941.

References

1914 births
1978 deaths
Footballers from North Lanarkshire
Scottish footballers
Association football wingers
Partick Thistle F.C. players
Aberdeen F.C. wartime guest players
Scotland youth international footballers
Portadown F.C. players
NIFL Premiership players
Scottish Football League players
Scotland international footballers
Date of death missing
Scottish Football League representative players
Scotland wartime international footballers
British Army personnel of World War II